New Holland Construction is an American manufacturer of construction machinery. Along with New Holland Agriculture, New Holland Construction is a brand of CNH. New Holland Construction produces construction equipment including backhoes, excavators and loaders.

History 
New Holland Construction was founded in 1895 in New Holland, Pennsylvania; in 2005 New Holland Construction Brand was created with a global full-line product offering. Since 1999, New Holland is a brand of CNH, which was demerged from Fiat Group to Fiat Industrial at the start of 2011.

Operations 
New Holland equipment is built all around the world; the headquarters is in Turin, Italy and with ten plants and ten research and development centers spread globally, more than 800 dealers and 2,100 outlets. It is present in 100 countries worldwide.

New Holland produces thirteen product families, five in the heavy range and eight in the light range; products include dozers, miniexcavators, graders, wheel loaders, crawler excavators, backhoe loaders, skid steer loaders.

Factories
CNH Industrial manufactures equipment under the New Holland brand in factories in

Gallery

Marketing 
From 2007 to 2010, the brand was the shirt sponsor for Juventus F.C.

See also 
 New Holland Agriculture

References

External links

CNH Industrial
Construction equipment manufacturers of the United States
1895 establishments in Pennsylvania
Manufacturing companies established in 1895
Manufacturing companies based in Turin